The Essential Shinran: A Buddhist Path of True Entrusting is a compilation of passages from the writings and life story of Shinran Shonin.  Shinran, who wrote during the Kamakura Period, was a Japanese monk who founded Jodo Shinshu Buddhism, which eventually became the largest Buddhist sect in Japan.

The book (compiled by Alfred Bloom, with a foreword by Ruben L.F. Habito) is divided into three major sections: 
Shinran's Life and Legacy
What Do We Know of Shinran in the Ancient Sources?
Shinran Interprets Pure Land Teaching.

The book is an attempt to bring Pure Land Buddhism to the attention of a Western audience.  

The book received the Silver (2nd) Book of the Year Award in the Religion category (2007) from ForeWord Magazine.

References

Biographies about religious figures
Pure Land Buddhism
History books about Buddhism
Buddhist philosophy
2007 non-fiction books